The Nation is a weekly English-language newspaper in Sri Lanka. It is published on every Sunday, by Rivira Media Corporation (Pvt) Ltd. A sister newspaper of Rivira, The Nation was established in 2006. It has a circulation of 132,000 per issue and an estimated readership of 662,000 by 2012. The newspaper comes with a range of supplements, including Politics, Sports, Business, Eye, and World. Editor in chief of The Nation newspaper is Malinda Seneviratne. The Nation has its weekend edition entitled Weekend Nation

See also
List of newspapers in Sri Lanka

References

External links
 

English-language newspapers published in Sri Lanka
Publications established in 2006
Rivira Media Corporation
Sunday newspapers published in Sri Lanka